Mark A. Drumbl is a scholar of international law and Class of 1975 Alumni Professor at Washington and Lee University School of Law.

Works

References

International law scholars
Living people
Washington and Lee University School of Law faculty
Year of birth missing (living people)